Hu Zhongming (born January 1964) is a vice admiral (zhongjiang) of the People's Liberation Army (PLA) who has been the chief of staff of the People's Liberation Army Navy since December 2021. He previously served as commander of Northern Theater Command Navy and deputy commander of the Northern Theater Command from December 2019 to December 2021.

Biography
Hu enlisted in the People's Liberation Army in 1979. He was an assistant chief of staff of the PLA Navy in March 2015 and then deputy chief of staff in May 2016. In December 2019, he was promoted to commander of Northern Theater Command Navy and deputy commander of the Northern Theater Command, succeeding Li Yujie.

He was promoted to the rank of rear admiral (Shaojiang) in July 2014 and vice admiral (zhongjiang) in December 2019.

References

Living people
People's Liberation Army generals
Members of the 20th Central Committee of the Chinese Communist Party
1964 births